Even Song may refer to:

"Even Song", a song by Gomez from their 2002 album In Our Gun
Even Song, a band on Displeased Records
"Even (Headman)", a song by Dispatch on their album Who Are We Living For?.

See also
 Evensong (disambiguation)